Soththisena was King of Anuradhapura in the 5th century, whose reign lasted the year 434. He succeeded his father Mahanama as King of Anuradhapura and was succeeded by his step sister's husband Chattagahaka Jantu.  According to the great history of Sri Lanka, King Soththisena, the shortest reigning king of Sri Lanka, ascended the throne in the morning and was assassinated that evening in a palace conspiracy.

See also
 List of Sri Lankan monarchs
 History of Sri Lanka

References

External links
Kings & Rulers of Sri Lanka
Codrington's Short History of Ceylon

Monarchs of Anuradhapura
S
S
S